Thomas M. Woodruff (born July 11, 1943) was an American politician in the state of Florida.

Woodruff was born in Charlotte, North Carolina in 1943 and moved to Florida in that same year with his family. He is a lawyer. He served in the Florida House of Representatives for the 58th district from 1976 to 1988, as a Republican.

References

Living people
1943 births
Republican Party members of the Florida House of Representatives